Stage Dolls is a Norwegian hard rock band based in Trondheim, Norway.

History
In 1982, Erlend Antonsen and Terje Storli played at local clubs in and around Trondheim. In need of a guitarist they called on Torstein Flakne, who by then had finished playing in The Kids (a popular teeny-band in Norway 1980-82). Throughout the summer and fall of 1982 the newly formed band started rehearsing and playing shows in the region. The trio took the name Stage Dolls in January 1983. The first album, titled Soldier's Gun, was released in late 1985, after a successful nationwide tour in Norway supporting the Norwegian band TNT.

Antonsen left the band in 1985 and was replaced by Steinar Krokstad; he in turn left in 1993 and was replaced by Morten Skogstad.

The recordings for their next album Commandos started in late 1985. It peaked at number 8 in the Norwegian charts (VG) and set the band up as one of the most popular rock bands in Norway in 1986. The album was released in the US by Big Time Records and the title track "Commandos" gained considerable airplay on college-radio.

The self-titled third album was released in 1988. It made it to number 3 at the charts in Norway, and the single "Wings of Steel" went to number 10. In 1989, the band released the album on Chrysalis Records for the American market. The single "Love Cries" went to number 46 on the Billboard Singles Charts the same year. A second single for the song "Still in Love" was also released in America.

In 1991, the band released a fourth album called Stripped. The album went to number 5 in Norway, and the single "Love Don't Bother Me" charted at number 3. The music video for the song, featured English model Kate Moss.

In 1995, Torstein Flakne released a solo album on Mercury Records in 1995 called Shoot the Moon.

Personnel

Current members
Torstein Flakne - lead vocals, lead guitar (1983–present)
Terje Storli - bass, backing vocals (1983–present)
Morten Skogstad - drums, percussion, backing vocals (1993–present)

Former members
Erlend Antonsen - drums, percussion, backing vocals (1983–1985)
Steinar Krokstad - drums, percussion, backing vocals (1985–1993)

Discography

Studio albums
Soldier's Gun (1985)
Commandos (1986)
Stage Dolls (1988)
Stripped (1991)
Dig (1997)
Get a Life (2004)
Always (2010)

Live albums
Get a Live CD + DVD (2005)

Compilation albums
Stories We Could Tell (1993)
Good Times - The Essential Stage Dolls (2002)

References

External links
 The band official website : STAGE DOLLS

1983 establishments in Norway
Grappa Music artists
Musical groups established in 1983
Musical groups from Trondheim
Norwegian glam metal musical groups
Norwegian hard rock musical groups
Norwegian heavy metal musical groups
Norwegian rock music groups